Mustafakemalpaşa Spor is a football club in the Mustafakemalpaşa neighborhood of Bursa, Turkey and its abbreviation is MKP. Mustafakemalpaşa Spor is named after the founder and first president of Turkey, Mustafa Kemal Atatürk, and was founded in the same year as the foundation of the republic, in 1923.

Mustafakemalpaşa
Football clubs in Turkey
Association football clubs established in 1923
1923 establishments in Turkey
Things named after Mustafa Kemal Atatürk